SDLP may refer to:

 Social Democratic and Labour Party, a political party of Northern Ireland
 Service de la protection, a unit of the French National Police
 Stanford Digital Library Project, a research programme from the mid 1990s to mid 2000s

See also

 
 SDLP Youth, the youth wing of the Social Democratic and Labour Party of Northern Ireland